The Mongolian Agricultural Commodity Exchange, also known as the Mongolian Commodity Exchange or simply as MCE (Mongolian: Хөдөө аж ахуйн бирж), is a state-owned commodity exchange located in Ulaanbaatar, Mongolia.

History 
The Mongolian Commodity Exchange LLC was first established on February 15, 2013, in accordance with the Law on Agricultural Products and Commodity Exchange and was first experimental futures market approved by the State Council. The exchange has continued to accredit multiple warehouses to trade throughout the country in a bid to encourage and sustain domestic herders and traders. An online trading site has also been operational since 2014.

Operations 
The MCE is open for trading on weekdays from 8 am to 5 pm UTC+8. It operates with four departments, the Trading and Market Development Department, the Membership and Registration Department, the Administration and Finance Department and the Information Technology Development Department. The exchange trades futures, options, forward and spot contracts for raw and processed agricultural products such as cashmere, wool, livestock, grain, meat and leather goods.

References

External links 
 

Commodity exchanges